Ilak is a village in Fayzobod District, Districts of Republican Subordination, Tajikistan. At the 2010 census, its population was 2049, in 524 families.

References 

Populated places in Districts of Republican Subordination